2Tm2,3 (nicknamed Tymoteusz) is a Polish Christian music band founded in 1996 by members of Polish top heavy metal and alternative music bands: Acid Drinkers, Flapjack, Armia, Houk. Name comes from 2 Timothy 2:3 ("Thou therefore endure hardness, as a good soldier of Jesus Christ.").

Discography

Studio albums

Live albums

Remix albums

Video albums

References

External links

 

Polish rock music groups
Christian metal musical groups
Christian rock groups
Catholic Church in Poland
Rock music supergroups